Ayodokun Samuel Akingbade (born June 5, 1984) is a Nigerian former professional basketball player who played for the Akita Northern Happinets of the Japanese bj league. He currently serves for the United States Department of State.

College statistics

|-
| style="text-align:left;"| 2002-03
| style="text-align:left;"| George Washington
| 26 ||0  ||6.4  || .350 || .000 || .375|| 1.38 ||0.00  || 0.23 || 0.15 || 0.65
|-
| style="text-align:left;"| 2003-04
| style="text-align:left;"| George Washington
| 8 ||0  ||1.5  || .000 || .000 || .000|| 0.25 ||0.00  || 0.00 || 0.00 || 0.00
|-
| style="text-align:left;"| 2004-05
| style="text-align:left;"| George Washington
| 20 ||2  ||6.5  || .438 || .000 || .500||1.30  ||0.00  || 0.15 || 0.35 || 1.75
|-
| style="text-align:left;"| 2006-07
| style="text-align:left;"| George Washington
| 32 ||31  ||22.8  || .547 || .000 || .554|| 5.56 ||0.97  || 0.38 || 0.75 || 7.25
|-
|- class="sortbottom"
! style="text-align:center;" colspan=2|  Career

!86 ||33 || 12.1 ||.513  || .000 ||.529  || 2.81 ||0.36  || 0.24 ||0.41  || 3.30
|-

Career statistics

Regular season 

|-
| align="left" | 2008-09
| align="left" | Niigata
| 33 || 30 || 32.9 || .471 || .000 || .548 || 12.8 || 1.3 || 0.7 || 0.5 ||  18.6
|-
| align="left" | 2009-10
| align="left" | Jämtland
| 36 ||    || 28.5 || .515 || .000 || .502 || 8.9 || 1.0 || 0.7 || 0.5 ||  16.6
|-
| align="left" | 2010-11
| align="left" | Fürstenfeld
| 1 ||    || 24.0 || .333 || .000 || .429 || 6.0 || 0.0 || 0.0 || 1.0 ||  9.0
|-
| align="left" | 2010-11
| align="left" | Akita
| 39 || 27 || 25.2 || .470 || .000 || .478 || 11.3 || 0.6 || 0.2 || 0.8 ||  9.3
|-
| align="left" | 2011-12
| align="left" | Düsseldorf
| 4 ||  || 6.0 || .375 || .000 || .667 || 0.8 || 0.5 || 0.0 || 0.0 ||  2.0
|-
| align="left" | 2012-13
| align="left" | Island Storm
| 8 || 7 || 20.1 || .400 || .000 || .345 || 4.88 || 1.88 || 0.25 || 0.25 ||  7.25
|-
|- class="sortbottom"
! style="text-align:center;" colspan=2| Japan totals

!72 ||57 || 28.7 ||.471  || .000 ||.522  || 12.0 ||0.9  || 0.4 ||0.7  || 13.6
|-

Playoffs 

|-
|style="text-align:left;"|2010-11
|style="text-align:left;"|Akita
| 2 ||  || 23.0 || .400 || .000 || .462 || 10.0 || 0.0 || 0.0 || 0.5 || 9.0
|-
|style="text-align:left;"|2011-12
|style="text-align:left;"|Düsseldorf
| 5 ||  || 4.6 || .333 || .000 || .500 || 1.6 || 0.0 || 0.0 || 0.0 || 1.8
|-

References

External links
Eurobasket.com profile
RealGM profile
Stats in Japan

1984 births
Living people
Akita Northern Happinets players
BSC Fürstenfeld Panthers players
George Washington Colonials men's basketball players
Island Storm players
Jämtland Basket players
Nigerian expatriate basketball people in Austria
Nigerian expatriate basketball people in Canada
Nigerian expatriate basketball people in Germany
Nigerian expatriate basketball people in Japan
Nigerian expatriate basketball people in Sweden
Nigerian expatriate basketball people in the United States
Nigerian men's basketball players
Niigata Albirex BB players
Sportspeople from Lagos